Dragoslav Srejović (Kragujevac, 8 October 1931 – 29 November 1996) was a Serbian archaeologist, cultural anthropologist and historian. He was the main contributor to the exploration of the Lepenski Vir archaeological site.

Biography
Srejović had a broad range of interests, and his fields of research range from paleolithic and mesolithic sites in Yugoslavia, through the late Roman period, to Greco-Roman mythology. He was a prolific author, having published more than 200 papers, over 20 monographs and a dozen guides and catalogs. He became a subscribing member of the Serbian Academy of Sciences and Arts in 1974, and a regular member in 1983, and later its vice-president.

Srejović was recipient of the October Award of City of Belgrade (1977) for his work on Lepenski Vir excavations, as well as the 7th July Award of the Socialist Republic of Serbia.

He was one of the very few openly gay public personalities in Serbia.

Selected works
Monographies
 Lepenski vir; Nova praistorijska kultura u Podunavlju (Lepenski Vir: A New Prehistoric Culture in the Danube Valley) (Belgrade, SKZ 1969); 
 Europe's First Monumental Sculpture. New Discoveries at Lepenski Vir (London 1972); 
 Umetnost Lepenskog vira (The Art of Lepenski Vir) (Belgrade 1983), with Ljubinka Babović
 Rečnik grčke i rimske mitologije (Dictionary of Greek and Roman Mythology) (SKZ Beograd 1979), with Aleksandrina Cermanović–Kuzmanović;  
 
 Leksikon religija i mitova drevne Evrope (Lexicon of Religions and Myths of Ancient Europe) (Savremena administracija, Beograd, 1992),  with Aleksandrina Cermanović–Kuzmanović;  
 Carski mauzoleji i konsekrativni spomenici u Feliks Romuliani (Imperial Mausoleums and Consecrative Monuments in Felix Romuliana) (Belgrade 1994), with Čedomir Vasić

References

1931 births
1996 deaths
Writers from Kragujevac
Serbian archaeologists
20th-century Serbian historians
Yugoslav archaeologists
Cultural anthropologists
Serbian LGBT people
Gay men
University of Belgrade Faculty of Philosophy alumni
Academic staff of the University of Belgrade
Members of the Serbian Academy of Sciences and Arts
20th-century archaeologists
20th-century LGBT people